Robinsons Iligan (formerly Robinsons Place Iligan) is a shopping mall located along Macapagal Avenue in Iligan. It is owned and operated by Robinsons Land Corporation, one of the largest mall operators in the Philippines. The mall opened on July 26, 2017. The mall is the first Robinsons Mall in the province of Lanao del Norte, and the 45th in the Philippines. It is also the first stand-alone Robinsons Mall in Northern Mindanao prior to Robinsons Cagayan De Oro that is located inside Limketkai Center. It has a gross leasable area of 33,190 m2 and a gross floor area of 50,483 m2.

History
Robinsons Malls announced that they'll be expanding more branches in Mindanao by 2014. One of which is in Iligan after the former Pryce Business Park which was sold to Robinsons Land Corporation.

The construction began on May 9, 2015, and took two years on its nearing completion. Originally, the mall's opening was scheduled on June 8, 2017. However, due to the Battle of Marawi that took place near Iligan, the opening was moved to July 26, 2017.

Features
The three-storey mall features 6 anchor stores. It has Lingkod Pinoy Service Center, Food Gallery, specialty stores and restaurants, outdoor parking spaces and a transport terminal.

The architectural design is inspired by the city's majestic waterfalls. There is a waterfall feature with stream of water cascading from the upper levels down to the al fresco area of the mall.

The mall complex also features a five-storey Go Hotel, with 100 rooms and a function hall.

References 

Shopping malls in the Philippines
Robinsons Malls
Shopping malls established in 2017